Chris O'Connor may refer to:

 Chris O'Connor (diplomat)
 Chris O'Connor (footballer) (born 1985), Australian football goalkeeper
 Chris O'Connor (model), female model, see List of Vogue Paris cover models
 Chris O'Connor (musician) (born 1965), American vocalist, guitarist and bassist